Marta Etura Palenzuela (born in 28 October, 1978) is a Spanish film and television actress. She is known for  Your Next Life (2004),  Cell 211 (2009), Sleep Tight (2011), and The Invisible Guardian (2017).

Biography 
Etura was born in 1978 in San Sebastián, where she studied at the French Lyceum. Willing to develop a career as an actress, she moved to Madrid and graduated from the acting school of Cristina Rota.

Filmography

Film

Television
 2016: La sonata del silencio
 2013: Águila Roja 
 2006: Vientos de agua 
 2003: La vida de Rita
 2000: Raquel busca su sitio

Theatre
 2012: Antígona 
 2008: Hamlet
 2007: Despertares y celebraciones

Accolades 
 Shooting Stars Award 2006 by European Film Promotion
 Goya Awards

References

External links 
 
 

1978 births
Actresses from the Basque Country (autonomous community)
Living people
People from San Sebastián
Spanish film actresses
21st-century Spanish actresses